The IMOCA 60 Class yacht Cheminées Poujoulat (5) was designed by Juan Kouyoumdjian built by Decision SA in Lausanne, Switzerland and launched in the year 2011. The boat was written off on 24th December 2013 after breaking apart on the return journey from the Transat Jacque Vabre.

Loss of boat and rescue
Bernard Stamm and crewmember Damien Guillou were rescued at 0600 on the 24 Dec 2013 after the boat broke up and they activate there EPIRB. The boat was 170 miles off the Scilly Isles when the event happened at 18:50 on the 23 December 2013. The rescue operation involved two helicopters and a fixed wing aircraft from the UK and France. The boat was in storm force 9 conditions with 10 meter waves that prevailed in the Western Approaches. The crew of Bernard Stamm and Damien Guillou were rescued by a Norwegian cargo vessel the Star Isfjord at 06:14 on the 24th in an exercise that took over two hours.  
 The cause of the incident is thought to be corrosion of the core in the hull laminate.

Racing results

References 

2000s sailing yachts
Sailboat type designs by Juan Kouyoumdjian
Sailboat types built in Switzerland 
Vendée Globe boats
IMOCA 60